Paulsen Mountains is a mountainrange including Brattskarvet Mountain, Vendeholten Mountain and Tverrveggen Ridge, located in the northern part of the Sverdrup Mountains in Queen Maud Land. Discovered by the German Antarctic Expedition under Alfred Ritscher, 1938–39, and named for Karl-Heinz Paulsen, oceanographer on the expedition.

Mountain ranges of Queen Maud Land
Princess Martha Coast